The women's qualification rounds at the 2015 World Artistic Gymnastics Championships took place on 23–24 October 2015 in The SSE Hydro in Glasgow. The top 8 teams advanced to team finals and guaranteed Olympic team berths; teams 9–16 qualified to the Olympic test event in early 2016 to compete for the final 4 team spots.

Team qualification
The top eight teams in qualification advance to the team finals in Glasgow and earn direct qualification status as a team to the 2016 Summer Olympics in Rio de Janeiro, Brazil. Teams placed 9th-16th advance to the Test Event held at the Olympic site in April 2016, from which the top four teams also earn qualification status for the Games.

Individual all-around

Vault

Uneven bars

Balance beam

Floor exercise

References 

2015 World Artistic Gymnastics Championships
2015 in women's gymnastics